Ivan Petrovich Ryzhov (25 January 1913, Zelyonaya Sloboda, Bronnitsky Uyezd, Moscow Governorate — 15 March 2004, Moscow) was a Soviet and Russian film and theater actor. People's Artist of the RSFSR (1980).

Biography
Ryzhov was born on 25 January 1913 in the village of Zelyonaya Sloboda, in the Bronnitsky Uyezd of the Moscow Governorate of the Russian Empire. In 1935, he graduated from the School of the Moscow Theater of the Revolution and became an actor of the theater.

He made his film debut in the role of Captain Soroka in the Kubans.

Ivan Ryzhov died on the morning of 15 March 2004 in a Moscow hospital. According to his daughter, it happened due to negligence of the medical staff: the actor had fallen and cut his hand. The funeral service took place not in the House of Cinema, as has happened with other famous actors, but in a small temple at Botkin Hospital, where he had died. The memorial was attended by relatives and artists.

He was buried at Perepechinskoe Cemetery.

Awards 
 Honored Artist of the RSFSR (4 September 1974)
 People's Artist of the RSFSR (25 July 1980)
 Order of the Red Banner of Labor (30 April 1991) — for his merits in the development of Soviet cinematic art

Select filmography
 1943 —  We from the Urals  as Ivan Dmitrievich
 1944 — Kashchey the Deathless as naughty boy
 1947 — Ballad of Siberia as on duty at the airport and lumberjacks
 1953 — Hostile Whirlwinds as soldier
 1956 — Ilya Muromets as head of horse guards
 1956 — A Weary Road as gendarme
 1957 — It Happened in Penkovo as farmer
 1958 — And Quiet Flows the Don as head of horse guards
 1959 — Mumu as Gavrila
 1959 — Tavriya as Mokeich
 1961 — Yevdokiya  as Ivan Yegorovich Shestyorkin
 1964 — Come Here, Mukhtar! as militia captain
 1964 — There Is Such a Lad as head of tank farms
 1964 — A Tale of Lost Times as foreman at a construction site
 1967 — Stewardess as passengers with baby toys
 1970 — Crime and Punishment as  Tit Vasilievich
 1972 — Taming of the Fire  as Alekseich
 1972 — Big School-Break as head of the police station
 1972 — As Ilf and Petrov rode a tram as Chief Editor
 1972 — Chipollino as Master Raisin (vote)
 1973 — Hopelessly Lost as Boggs
 1973 — The Red Snowball Tree as Fyodor 
 1973 — Incorrigible Liar as senior master
 1974 — A Lover's Romance as Vasily Vasilievich
 1976 — How Czar Peter the Great Married Off His Moor as Gavrilo Afanasievich Rtishchev
 1976 — The Days of the Turbins as footman Fyodor
 1977 — White Bim Black Ear as Pal Titych, house manager
 1983 — Quarantine as Petrovich
 1988 — Yolki-palki as granddad
 1994 — Life and Extraordinary Adventures of Private Ivan Chonkin as Shapkin
 1995 — Heads and Tails as Timofeich

References

External links

 

1913 births
2004 deaths
People from Ramensky District
People from Bronnitsky Uyezd
Russian male film actors
Soviet male film actors
Russian male stage actors
Soviet male stage actors
People's Artists of the RSFSR
Honored Artists of the RSFSR
20th-century Russian male actors